Henry Pierce Bone (6 November 1779 – 21 October 1855 London) was an English enamel painter.

Life
Bone was the son of Henry Bone, the notable enamel painter, and Elizabeth Van der Meulen,  a descendant of the distinguished battle-painter Adam Frans van der Meulen. His brother was the artist Robert Trewick Bone (1790–1840). He received his art education from his father.

He commenced as a painter in oils, and exhibited some portraits at the age of twenty. In 1806 he began painting classical subjects, and continued doing so until 1833, when he reverted to his father's art of enameling, which he continued to practise until the year of his death.

In 1846 he published a catalogue of his enamels. He was appointed successively enamel painter to Adelaide of Saxe-Meiningen and to Queen Victoria and Albert of Saxe-Coburg and Gotha. Though his enamels did not attain the quality of his father's, they display very considerable ability, and he was not only a rapid sketcher, but his designs for classical and scripture subjects were bold and skilful.

Bone died at 22 Percy Street, Bedford Square, London on 21 October 1855.

References

Attribution:

External links

H. P. Bone on Artnet
Works by H. P. Bone (Royal Collection)
Henry, Prince of Wales (Enamel on copper in gilded metal frame - V&A, London)

1779 births
1855 deaths
18th-century English painters
English male painters
19th-century English painters
English enamellers
18th-century enamellers
19th-century enamellers
19th-century English male artists
18th-century English male artists